The Sauber C20 was the car with which the Sauber Formula One team competed in the 2001 Formula One season. It was powered by a Petronas-branded '01A' 3.0-litre V10, supplied by Scuderia Ferrari. The C20 was notable not only for its eventual position in the  Constructors' World Championship but also for a new type of front suspension mounting: the "twin keel".

The twin keel
The effect of airflow underneath the nose had first become apparent in the early 1990s. By the end of the decade, most teams had settled for a design where both lower front suspension arms were mounted from a single longitudinal "keel" running underneath the nose. For 2001, the FIA introduced a regulation lifting the sides of the front wing by 50mm, in order to reduce downforce and cut cornering speeds.

Sauber had introduced separate pylons for each of the front suspension mounts on their previous car, the C19. For the C20, the area between the front and back mounting points on each side was filled in, creating two longitudinal keels running underneath the sides of the nose. Sergio Rinland designed the car, and then promptly left the team to join Arrows, leaving the C20's development in the hands of Willi Rampf. 

Despite operating on a relatively modest budget, weight saving was a major consideration in the design of the car, and the team spent 35 weeks perfecting the aerodynamic package in the wind tunnel during the design phase.

Drivers
In contrast to the previous season's experienced pairing of Mika Salo and Pedro Diniz, Peter Sauber signed Germany's Nick Heidfeld and Finnish rookie Kimi Räikkönen. His lack of experience prompted some drivers and FIA officials, including Max Mosley, to question the wisdom of this decision. Heidfeld had made his debut with Prost Grand Prix in 2000, but Räikkönen was a 21-year-old whose only previous single-seater formula experience amounted to one and a half seasons in British Formula Renault from 1999 to 2000, albeit culminating in a title win.

However, the young Finn's performances belied his age and lack of experience, with a point-scoring finish on his debut and a further four points-scoring finishes throughout the year. Heidfeld achieved a podium (one of six in Sauber's history) with third place in the Brazilian Grand Prix and scored points on six other occasions.

Constructors' World Championship
The C20 turned out to be one of Sauber's most competitive chassis, providing the team with a points total of 21 and fourth place in the Constructors' World Championship standings.

The C20 achieved 11 points finishes and 10 non-scoring finishes from 33 starts.

Sponsorship and livery 
As with all Sauber models between 1995 and 2003, the choice of paint color was based on the colors of the main sponsors. Most of the chassis was in the blue of the beverage manufacturer Red Bull, the sides were painted in Petronas cyan. In addition to the two previous main sponsors, the Swiss bank Credit Suisse also came to the fore as a new sponsor. For this reason, the vehicle nose was painted white for the first time.

Complete Formula One results
(key) (results in bold indicate pole position) 

* Denotes Ferrari-built engines, badged as Petronas

References

External links

C20
2001 Formula One season cars